The 2019 Ball Hockey World Championship was the 13th ball hockey world championship, and was held in Košice, Slovakia. The tournament began on 14 June 2019, with the gold medal game to be played on 22 June 2019. The Canada women's national ball hockey team defeated the United States women's national ball hockey team in the women's final to capture the gold medal, while the Czech Republic emerged with the bronze.

Venue

Participants

Group A1
 Slovakia
 Czech Republic
 USA
 Finland
 Great Britain

Group A2
 Canada
 Greece
 Switzerland
 Italy
 Haiti

Group Q
 Hong Kong
 Armenia
 Cayman Islands
 Lebanon
 Bermuda

Women's
 Czech Republic
 USA
 Canada
 Slovakia
 Great Britain

Awards and honors

Women's tournament

All-Star Team
Samantha Bolwell: Great Britain
Denisa Křížová: Czech Republic
Lucie Manhartová : Czech Republic
Jessie McCann: Canada
Cherie Stewart: United States
Lucia Zábroská: Slovakia

References

External links
 Official website

Ball Hockey World Championship
International sports competitions hosted by Slovakia
Sport in Košice
2019 in Slovak sport